The  saddle-back tamarins are squirrel-sized New World monkeys from the family Callitrichidae in the genus or subgenus Leontocebus.  They were split from the tamarin genus Saguinus based on genetic data and on the fact that saddle-back tamarins are sympatric with members of Saguinus to a greater extent than would be expected from two members of the same genus. However, this argument can be circular, as several other mammals show sympatry among congeneric species, such as armadillos (genus Dasypus), spotted cats (genus Leopardus), and fruit-eating bats (genus Artibeus). Some authors still consider Leontocebus to be a subgenus of Saguinus.

Species include:

Cruz Lima's saddle-back tamarin, (Leontocebus cruzlimai)
Brown-mantled tamarin or Spix's saddle-back tamarin, (Leontocebus fuscicollis)
Lesson's saddle-back tamarin, (Leontocebus fuscus)
Illiger's saddle-back tamarin, (Leontocebus illigeri)
Red-mantled saddle-back tamarin, (Leontocebus lagonotus)
Andean saddle-back tamarin, (Leontocebus leucogenys)
Black-mantled tamarin, (Leontocebus nigricollis)
Geoffroy's saddle-back tamarin, (Leontocebus nigrifrons)
Golden-mantled tamarin or Golden-mantled saddle-back tamarin, (Leontocebus tripartitus)
Weddell's saddle-back tamarin, (Leontocebus weddelli)

In some locations saddle-back tamarins live sympatrically with tamarins of the genus Sanguinus, but the saddle-back tamarins typically occupy lower strata of the forest than do the Sanguinus species.  Saddle-back tamarins have longer and narrower hands than Sanguinus species, possibly adaption to differing foraging behavior, as saddle-back tamarins are more likely to search for insects that are hidden in knotholes, crevices, bromeliad tanks and leaf litter, while Sanguinus species are more likely to forage for insects that are exposed on surfaces such as leaves or branches.

References

Callitrichidae
Primates of South America
Leontocebus